The following is a timeline of the history of Brussels, Belgium.

Prehistory
 3000–2200 BCE – First known settlements in Brussels during Neolithic era, located in the Sonian Forest.

Roman Period
 1st century CE – Roman villa constructed in Anderlecht, located near the /.
 2nd century CE – Gallo-Roman villa constructed in Jette, located in the King Baudouin Park.

Middle Ages
 580 – Saint Gaugericus builds a chapel on an island in the river Senne.

 979 – Charles of Lorraine transfers the relics from Saint Gudula to the chapel built by Saint Gaugericus.
 1012 – Guy of Anderlecht dies in Anderlecht on his return home from a pilgrimage to Jerusalem.
 1015–1020 – Oldest written record of Brussels by Olbert of Gembloux.
 1229 – Henry I, Duke of Brabant, issues charter of city rights for Brussels.
 1273 – First stage of the rebuilding of the Church of St Michael and St Gudula in the Gothic style completed (approximate date).
 1304 – Church of Our Blessed Lady of the Sablon founded.
 1308 – Meyboom first attested.
 1348 – Ommegang begins as a Marian procession.
 1356
 Joyous Entry of Joanna and Wenceslaus into city.
 Expansion of fortifications of Brussels begins.
 1370 – Brussels massacre occurs, followed by the expulsion of the city's remaining Jewish population.
 1381 – Halle Gate built.
 1393 – Anderlecht becomes part of Brussels.
 1420 – Brussels Town Hall built.
 1455 – Chapel of the Blessed Sacrament of the Miracle built.
 1476  – Printing press in operation.
 1477 – Habsburgs come to power in Burgundy.

16th century
 1536 – King's House built for Duke of Brabant.
 1568 – Counts of Egmont and Horn executed.
 1585 – City becomes capital of Spanish Netherlands.
 1619 – Bronze Manneken Pis statue installed.
 1622 – Funeral of Albert VII of Austria
 1695 – City is bombarded by the French, destroying a third of its buildings, including the Grand-Place/Grote Markt.
 1700 – Théâtre de la Monnoye built.

18th century
 1713 – City becomes part of Austrian Netherlands.
 1714 – Belfry of Brussels collapses.
 1719 – François Anneessens executed.
 1731 – Palace of Coudenberg destroyed.
 1746 – Siege of Brussels.
 1772
 Imperial and Royal Academy of Brussels established.
 Opéra flamand established. 
 1774 – Rue Royale/Koningsstraat laid out.
 1775 – Brussels Park laid out.
 1782 – Place Royale/Koningsplein laid out.
 1787 – Vauxhall opens.
 1783 – Royal Palace of Brussels construction begins.
 1784 – City gates demolished, except for the Halle Gate.
 1787 – Church of St. James on Coudenberg consecrated.
 1789 – Brabant Revolution reaches Brussels and makes the Austrian authorities flee.
 1790 – December: The Austrians take the city back and pledge to reverse the reforms of Joseph II.
 1795 – French rule begins; city becomes part of the department of the Dyle.
 1796
 La Cambre Abbey and Forest Abbey abolished.
 Church of St. Gaugericus demolished.

19th century
 1803 – Museum of Brussels opens.
 1815
 Duchess of Richmond's ball.
 City becomes joint capital of United Kingdom of the Netherlands.
 1819 – New opera theatre inaugurated.
 1822 – Société Générale de Belgique headquartered in city.
 1826 – Botanical Garden of Brussels founded.

 1830
 Belgian Revolution.
 City becomes capital of Kingdom of Belgium.
 Population: 98,279 city; 120,981 metro.
 1832 – Royal Conservatory of Brussels founded.
 1834 – Free University of Brussels founded
 1835 – Groendreef/Allée Verte railway station, Belgium's first, is inaugurated.
 1846
 Royal Belgian Institute of Natural Sciences founded.
 Population: 123,874.
 1847
 Avenue Louise/Louizalaan commissioned.
 Royal Saint-Hubert Galleries open.
 1848 – International Peace Congress held.
 1850 – Population: 142,289 city; 222,424 metro.

 1855 – Brussels-Luxembourg railway station built.
 1856 – Théâtre Royal de la Monnaie opens.
 1859 – Congress Column erected.
 1860 – Population: 185,982 city; 300,341 metro.
 1861 – Bois de la Cambre/Ter Kamerenbos laid out.
 1869 – Trams begin operating.
 1871
 Covering of the Senne.
 Central Boulevards of Brussels built.
  established.
 1873 – New building for the Brussels Stock Exchange completed.
 1877 – Ixelles Cemetery created.
 1880
 Cinquantenaire/Jubelpark created.
 White slave trade affair scandal is exposed and attracts international attention.
 1881 – L'Echo newspaper begins publication.
 1883 – Palace of Justice inaugurated.
 1885
 Saint Mary's Royal Church built.
 Population: 171,751.
 1887
 Le Soir newspaper begins publication.
 Palace for Fine Arts built.
 1888 – Het Laatste Nieuws newspaper begins publication.
 1889 – November: Brussels Anti-Slavery Conference 1889–90 begins.
 1890 –  enter service as a central abattoir for the whole city.
 1891 – August: International Socialist Labor Congress held in city.
 1893
 Paris–Brussels cycle race begins.
 Hôtel Tassel built.
 Hankar House built.
 1894 – Société Belge d'Études Coloniales headquartered in city.
 1895
 Royal Greenhouses of Laeken built.
 Hotel Métropole in business at the Place de Brouckère/De Brouckèreplein.
 1896 – King's House rebuilt.
 1897
 Brussels International world's fair held.
 Avenue de Tervueren/Tervurenlaan laid out.
 1899 – Maison du Peuple/Volkshuis built.
 1900
 Cantillon brewery founded.
 Saint-Jean Hospital built.

20th century
 
 1901 – Maison & Atelier Horta built.
 1905
 Cauchie House built.
 Cinquantenaire's memorial arch finished.
 1908 – Chapel of the Resurrection built.
 1910 – Brussels International world's fair held.

 1911 
 Solvay Conference held in city.
 Stoclet Palace built.
 1914 – World War I: City captured and occupied by the German Army.
 1917 – Constant Vanden Stock Stadium opens.
 1919
 Lignes Farman airline begins operating its Paris–Brussels route.
 Population: 685,268 metro.
 1920 – Oscar Bossaert Stadium opens.
 1921 – Haren, Laeken, and Neder-Over-Heembeek, merged into the City of Brussels.
 1923 – Royal Museum of the Armed Forces and Military History opens.
 1927 – Solvay Conference held.
 1930 – Jubilee Stadium opens.
 1931 – Brussels Symphony Orchestra founded.
 1934 – Villa Empain built.
 1935
 Brussels International world's fair held; Palais des Expositions built.
 Basilica of the Sacred Heart consecrated.
 City co-hosts the 1935 European Wrestling Championships.
 1937 – Queen Elisabeth Competition begins.
 1939 – Constantin Meunier Museum opens.
 1940
 World War II: German occupation begins.
 German Military Administration in Belgium and Northern France headquartered in city.
 July: Frontstalag 110 prisoner-of-war camp established by the Germans.
 1941 – Frontstalag 110 POW camp dissolved.

 1944
 3–4 September: Liberation of Brussels by the Welsh Guards; Palace of Justice burnt by Germans to destroy legal records during their retreat.
 8 September: Belgian government in exile returns to city after four years in London.
 District of Brussels, formed by Nazi Germany, no longer in control of the territory.
 1948
 Treaty of Brussels signed.
 Brussels Airport opens.
 1949 – NATO headquarters established.
 1950 – City hosts the 1950 European Athletics Championships.
 1952 – North–South connection completed; Brussels Central Station and Brussels-South railway station open.
 1953 – City hosts the 1953 World Fencing Championships.

 1958
 Expo 58 world's fair held; Atomium built.
 City becomes one of the seats of the European Community.
 1960 – City hosts Congolese Round Table Conference.
 1967 – L'Innovation department store fire.
 1969 – Free University of Brussels splits along linguistic lines into Université Libre de Bruxelles (ULB) and Vrije Universiteit Brussel (VUB).
 1971
  created.
 Flower carpet on Grand-Place begins.
 1972 – City hosts the 1972 European Karate Championships.
 1974 – Brussels Independent Film Festival begins.
 1975
 Bank Brussels Lambert headquartered in city.
 Université catholique de Louvain's  established.
 1976 – Brussels Metro begins operating.
 1978
 Brussels Ring constructed.
 RTBF Symphony Orchestra formed.
 1979
 May: City hosts the 1979 European Judo Championships.
 Archives of the City of Brussels moves into the former .
 1980
 Flemish Community and French Community of Belgium each designate Brussels as capital city.
 Population of Brussels-Capital Region: 1,008,715.
 1985
 Pope John Paul II visits city.
 29 May: Heysel Stadium disaster.
 1988 – Kinepolis Brussels opens.
 1989
 Brussels-Capital Region formed; Parliament of the Brussels-Capital Region and Minister-President of the Brussels-Capital Region established.
 Belgian Comic Strip Center opens.
 Mini-Europe opens.
 1990 – Population of Brussels-Capital Region: 964,385.
 1993 – Espace Léopold opens.
 1994
 City of Brussels designated capital of Belgium and seat of Federal Government.
 Freddy Thielemans becomes mayor.
1995
Erasmus Brussels University of Applied Sciences and Arts is established after a merger of some ten colleges in and around Brussels. 
 1996 – Belgacom Towers built.
 1998 – Ancienne Belgique renovated.
 1999 – Wedding of Prince Philippe and Mathilde d'Udekem d'Acoz.
 2000
 City named European Capital of Culture alongside eight other European cities.
 Zinneke Parade begins.
 Musical Instrument Museum (MIM) relocates.

21st century
 2004 – North Galaxy Towers built.
 2006 – Atomium renovated.
 2007 – Hogeschool-Universiteit Brussel established.
 2009 – Magritte Museum opens.
 2010 – Population of Brussels-Capital Region: 1,089,538.
 2013
 Brussels Agreement signed.
 Yvan Mayeur becomes mayor.
 Rudi Vervoort becomes Minister-President of the Brussels-Capital Region.
 Fin-de-Siècle Museum opens.
 2014 – Jewish Museum of Belgium shooting.
 2016 – Brussels bombings occur, killing 34 and injuring 230.
 2017
 20 June: June 2017 Brussels attack.
 25 August: August 2017 Brussels attack.

See also
 
 List of mayors of the City of Brussels (largest municipality in the Brussels-Capital Region)
 List of municipalities of the Brussels-Capital Region
 Timeline of Belgian history
 Timelines of other municipalities in Belgium: Antwerp, Bruges, Ghent, Leuven, Liège

References

Notes

This article incorporates information from the French Wikipedia.

Bibliography

In English
Published in the 19th century
 
 
 
 
 
 
 
 
 

Published in the 20th century
 
 
 
 
 

Published in the 21st century
 
  - translation of "L’intégration des nouveaux arrivants à Bruxelles : un puzzle institutionnel et politique"

In other languages

External links

 Europeana. Items related to Brussels, various dates.

 
Brussels
Brussels, Timeline
Years in Belgium
Brussels